The Time of His Life is a 1955 British comedy film directed by Leslie S. Hiscott and starring Richard Hearne, Ellen Pollock, Richard Wattis and Robert Moreton. The screenplay concerns a man who is released from prison and goes to live with his socialite daughter.

Plot
When newly released prisoner Mr. Pastry (Richard Hearne) arrives to stay, he proves an embarrassment to his social climbing daughter Lady Florence (Ellen Pollock). As president of the society for the rehabilitation of ex-convicts, she attempts to hide the fact her father is an ex-con. She locks Mr. Pastry in his bedroom, and even plots to have him sent to Australia. But Lady Florence's children see Mr. Pastry differently, and he helps them through a problem, prompting even his daughter to see Mr. Pastry in a new light.

Cast
 Richard Hearne as Charles Pastry
 Ellen Pollock as Lady Florence
 Richard Wattis as Edgar
 Robert Moreton as Humphrey
 Frederick Leister as Sir John
 Peter Sinclair as Kane
 John Downing as Simon
 Anne Smith as Penelope
 Darcy Conyers as Morgan
 Yvonne Hearne as Guest
 Peggy Ann Clifford as Cook
 Arthur Hewlett as Prison Governor
 Harry Towb as Steele

Critical reception
TV Guide gave the film two out of five stars, calling it a "simple comedy with likable characters"; the Radio Times rated the film three out of five stars, and wrote, "Though not a patch on Pastry's many TV shows, it's still a nostalgic treat"; and Sky Movies also rated the film three out of five stars, writing, "Both comedy and pathos come off well in an unpretentious little film that has likeable characters, an acceptable story and some amusing situations. In the supporting cast: two other music-hall comedians – Robert Moreton, once famous for his 'Bumper Fun Book' and Peter Sinclair."

References

External links

1955 films
1955 comedy films
British comedy films
1950s English-language films
Films directed by Leslie S. Hiscott
1950s British films
British black-and-white films